Mohamed Ezzat Ahmed Shafiq Abou Aouf (21 August 1948 – 1 July 2019) was an Egyptian actor and composer. Abou Aouf obtained his bachelor degree in medicine. His acting debut was in 1992 in Ice Cream in Gleam (Ays Krim fi Glym) with the Egyptian singer Amr Diab.

References 

1948 births
2019 deaths
20th-century Egyptian artists
Egyptian composers
Egyptian male actors
20th-century Egyptian physicians